DXMD (927 AM) RMN General Santos is a radio station owned and operated by the Radio Mindanao Network. The station's studio and transmitter are located along National Hi-way, Brgy. Obrero, General Santos.

References

Radio stations established in 1978
News and talk radio stations in the Philippines
Radio stations in General Santos